Sergey Alexandrovich Kovalev; born 2 April 1983) is a Russian professional boxer. He has held multiple light-heavyweight world championships, including the WBA (Undisputed) and IBF titles from 2014 to 2016, and the WBO title three times between 2013 and 2019. Nicknamed the "Krusher", Kovalev is particularly known for his exceptional punching power, although he describes himself as "just a regular boxer".

In November 2019, Kovalev was ranked as the world's second-best light-heavyweight by The Ring magazine, third by BoxRec, and fourth by the Transnational Boxing Rankings Board. In 2014, The Ring named him its Fighter of the Year.

Early years
Kovalev was initially interested in ice hockey, but stopped playing after his equipment was stolen from a dressing room. Because his parents could not afford to purchase replacement equipment, he tried other sports. Several months after he stopped playing hockey, he began to practice both boxing and amateur wrestling.

Amateur career
Kovalev started boxing in 1994 at the age of 11 and made his amateur debut in the 1997 Russian Boxing Junior Championship, where he won a gold medal in the middleweight juniors division. One year later, he competed with the seniors and reached the finals, and won the final fight the year after. He competed in the European Championships for the Russian team.

In 2004, Kovalev participated in the Russian Senior Championship for the first time, reached the finals, and won the gold medal in the team event. In 2005, he reached the peak of his amateur career and won two championships: the first as a champion of Russia and the second as a champion among servicemen. He won the silver medal in the championship for servicemen in 2006. In 2007, he finished third in both the Russian Championship and World Military Games in India.

In 2008, Kovalev participated in his final amateur competition and reached the finals, after which he decided to turn professional. Kovalev admitted that he felt forced to leave the national team because of the intense competition between him and others boxers such as Artur Beterbiev (to whom he lost 24–25). Kovalev finished his amateur career with a record of 195–18.

Highlights
 2000 Russian Junior Championships silver medalist at light-welterweight
 2001 Russian Junior Championships silver medalist at middleweight
 2004 Russian Championships silver medalist at middleweight, losing to Matt Korobov
 2005 Russian Championships gold medalist at middleweight
 2005 World Military Championships gold medalist at light-heavyweight, in Pretoria, South Africa
 2006 World Military Championships silver medalist at light-heavyweight, in Warendorf, Germany
 2007 World Military Championships gold medalist at light-heavyweight, in Hyderabad, India
 2007 Russian Championships bronze medalist at light-heavyweight, losing to Artur Beterbiev
 2008 Russian Championships silver medalist at light-heavyweight.

Professional career

Early career
Kovalev started his career with a first-round KO of Daniel Chavez at Greensboro Coliseum in Greensboro, North Carolina. 

In July 2011, Kovalev won his first North American Boxing Association belt in a 10-round fight with Douglas Otieno from Kenya. His next bout against Grover Young was controversial: during the second round, Kovalev threw a left hook that the judges declared an illegal blow to the back of the head. Due to Young's inability to continue, the fight was declared a technical draw.

In his 2011 fight against Roman Simakov of Russia, Kovalev knocked down his opponent in the sixth round. The fight was stopped and Kovalev was awarded a TKO victory. Simakov was taken to the hospital, where he lapsed into a coma and died three days later.

In 2012, John David Jackson became Kovalev's trainer. Kovalev met Darnell Boone in the ring for the second time and knocked him out in the second round; the win led him to be signed on to Main Events boxing.

On 19 January 2013, Kovalev faced the former World Boxing Association (WBA) light-heavyweight champion Gabriel Campillo. Kovalev took advantage of Campillo's faltering defense and knocked him down with a left hook, one of three knockdowns in the round.

WBO light-heavyweight champion

Kovalev vs. Cleverly
On 17 August 2013, Kovalev fought Nathan Cleverly for the World Boxing Organization (WBO) light-heavyweight title. Kovalev, who knocked most of his opponents out within three rounds, threw heavy shots in the first round, and hurt Cleverly badly in the third round, dropping him twice. Kovalev knocked Cleverly down a third time in the fourth round until the referee intervened; it was the first time Cleverly had been knocked down as a professional.

Title defenses
On 30 November 2013, Kovalev had his first defense of the WBO light-heavyweight title against #15 Ismayl Sillakh (21–1, 17 KO's). In round two, Kovalev dropped Sillakh, and when Sillakh could not regain his footing, Kovalev floored him a second time and ended the fight. The fight averaged 1.25 million viewers on HBO.

On 29 March 2014, Kovalev defended his title against undefeated Cedric Agnew (26–0, 13 KOs) at the Adrian Phillips Ballroom at Boardwalk Hall in Atlantic City. Although Agnew was not known to many boxing fans at the time, he won against Yusaf Mack, Daniel Judah, and Otis Griffin. Agnew's movement gave Kovalev difficulty at times, but after three falls, Agnew was finished in the seventh round. The fight drew an average of 1.048 million viewers on HBO. Although the figures were down from the Kovalev vs. Sillakh bout, the fight was televised at the same time as Wisconsin vs. Arizona, competing to reach the Final Four of the NCAA's college basketball tournament.

On 2 August 2014, Kovalev defended his WBO title against undefeated Australian contender Blake Caparello (19–0–1, 6 KOs) at the Revel Casino Hotel in Atlantic City, New Jersey, and it was televised on Boxing After Dark. Kovalev hoped for a unification fight against WBC champion Adonis Stevenson, but Stevenson stated he would only fight on Showtime; as Kovalev was contracted to HBO, he had to fight Caparello instead. Caparello scored a flash knockdown after catching Kovalev with a solid shot while Kovalev was off balance. Kovalev, however, was unhurt and even appeared enraged, and beat Caparello in a second-round technical knockout. The fight was watched by an average of 990,000 viewers and peaked at 1.052 million. Kovalev's victory allowed him to fight Bernard Hopkins in the fall of 2014. Main Events spokesperson Kathy Duva believed there was a loss of focus due to building pressure, which was why Kovalev was dropped by Caparello. Kovalev shrugged off any claims that he felt pressure, saying, "I didn't think about Bernard Hopkins tonight. I was focused on this fight. It is very important. A big step for me. If I do not win the fight, there is no fight with Bernard Hopkins." Lou DiBella, a promoter of Caparello, praised Kovalev, particularly the body shot that ended the fight. Negotiations for the Hopkins fight began prior to the Caparello fight.

Unified light-heavyweight champion

Kovalev vs. Hopkins
On 8 November 2014, Kovalev and Hopkins (55–6–2, 32 KOs) fought in a unification bout at the Boardwalk Hall.  The fight was televised on HBO World Championship Boxing.  Kovalev defeated Hopkins by unanimous decision to retain the WBO light-heavyweight title, and win the WBA (Super) and IBF titles. In a one-sided fight, Kovalev knocked Hopkins down in the first round, and won every single round on all of the three judges' scorecards. The score totals of the fight were 120–107, 120–107, and 120–106. In round 12, Kovalev landed 38 punches on Hopkins, the most any boxer had ever landed on him in a single round in his 41 fights recorded by CompuBox. Hopkins earned $1 million whilst Kovalev earned $500,000. Kovalev said after the fight, "I'm very happy. This victory was for my son Aleksandr." The fight was considered successful, as it was watched by an average of 1.328 million viewers.

Kovalev vs. Pascal
On 14 March 2015, Kovalev defended his world titles and fought Jean Pascal (29–2–1, 17 KOs) for the WBC Diamond light-heavyweight title at the Bell Centre in Montreal live on HBO. Kovalev had just been named Sports Illustrated's 2014 Fighter of the Year. In the eighth round, the referee stopped the fight as he felt Pascal was badly injured. However, Pascal felt the interruption was unfair and demanded a rematch; at the time, Kovalev led 68–64 on all three judges' scorecards. The fight averaged 1.152 million viewers on HBO.

Kovalev vs. Mohammedi
On 25 July 2015, Kovalev fought French boxer Nadjib Mohammedi (37–3, 23 KOs) at the Mandalay Bay Resort & Casino in Las Vegas. Kovalev knocked Mohammedi down once in the second round and again in the third round. The second knockdown ended Mohammedi's night and gave Kovalev his 25th knockout victory. Kovalev said in the post-fight interview, "I wanted more rounds. I wanted him to look like a clown. I wanted him to look foolish. I'm very happy that I got the victory," Kovalev said. "I gave my best. I am happy. I told him to stand up. It was a short show. People didn't see boxing." Abel Sanchez, Mohammedi's trainer, believed his boxer was overwhelmed with being on the main event and feeling pressured. Kovalev earned $750,000 and Mohammedi earned a career-high $270,000. The fight was seen by just over 1 million viewers on HBO.

Duva stated that Kovalev was looking for a homecoming bout next, likely on 28 November in Moscow, and stated she would call promoter Yvon Michel to set up a fight with two-time Olympian Artur Beterbiev (9–0, 9 KOs), who defeated Kovalev in the amateurs. The fight was unlikely to happen as Beterbiev was advised by Al Haymon, and performed on Premier Boxing Champions, who were banned by HBO.

Kovalev vs. Pascal, Chilemba
Kovalev had a rematch with Pascal on 30 January 2016 at the Bell Centre in Montreal on HBO. Pascal was pumped for the rematch, stating it would turn out differently to the first fight: "I put him down in the eighth round in the first fight, but [the referee] called it a slip. But I promise you that Kovalev is going to have a full plate in the rematch. I'm going to have a full plate as well, but I have a new trainer [Freddie Roach]. I'm going to teach him respect and to respect Canadian boxing fans."

Kovalev dominated the fight, both outpunching and outlanding Pascal by wide margins. Kovalev won when Roach refused to let Pascal continue after the seventh round. During the pause, the scorecards read 70–62 three times in favor of Kovalev. Round 5 was scored 10–8 on all three judges' cards without a knockdown. After the round, Roach threatened to pull Pascal. According to CompuBox stats, Kovalev landed 165 of 412 punches (40%) and Pascal landed 30 of 108 blows (28%).

After the fight, Kovalev said his future plans would likely include a fight with former super middleweight champion Andre Ward, but he first wanted a unification bout with reigning WBC and recognized Adonis Stevenson, a lineal champion. Kovalev called Stevenson "Adonis Chickenson" during the post-fight interview. Stevenson, who was in attendance, responded by confronting Kovalev in the ring surrounded by three bodyguards. The fight averaged 1.179 million viewers on HBO and peaked at 1.269 million viewers.

Kovalev had a warm-up fight on 11 July against Isaac Chilemba (24–3–2, 10 KOs) in Ekaterinburg, Russia, at the Palace of Sports; it was the first time in five years that Kovalev returned to Russia for a fight to defend his WBA (Super), IBF, and WBO light-heavyweight titles. Chilemba was known for having a similar style to Ward. Kovalev tipped the scales at 174.6lbs, while Chilemba weighed in at 174.8lbs. Kovalev earned a unanimous points decision after a hard-earned battle. The three judges at ringside scored the fight 117–110, 116-111, and 118–109 at the end of 12 rounds in favour of Kovalev, who retained his titles. In round 7, Chilemba staggered across the ropes and was downed by a straight left with a right to the jaw. The fight aired live on HBO and averaged 355,000 viewers.

Consecutive defeats

Kovalev vs. Ward

On 16 June 2016, it was announced that a contract had been signed between Kovalev and Ward (30–0, 15 KOs), and that the match would take place at the T-Mobile Arena in Las Vegas on 19 November 2016. Both fighters remained undefeated through interim bouts.

Kovalev lost a closely contested controversial decision with all the judges scoring the fight 114–113 in favor of Ward. Larry Merchant stated after the fight, "It was a classic hometown decision, Kovalev won the fight!" Gareth Davies, boxing correspondent, gave the fight to Kovalev with 115–112, as did Max Kellerman. Duva, said, "We got a great fight, which is what boxing needed. But we also got a bad decision, which is not what boxing needed." Many boxing experts have applauded the decision: Paulie Malignaggi noted the high degree of difficulty both fighters faced that night and doubted the prospect of a one-sided affair in the case of a rematch, though he concluded that Kovalev faded late in the fight; promoter Eddie Hearn added that Kovalev lacked a sense of urgency after the halfway point; Gennady Golovkin's trainer, Abel Sanchez, noticed how Kovalev allowed Ward on the inside and as a result was worn down. For the fight, Kovalev received a minimum of $2 million and Ward a career-high $5 million. CompuBox stats showed that Kovalev landed 126 of 474 punches (27%), and Ward landed 116 out of 337 thrown (34%).

The fight was reported to have accomplished 160,000 buys on HBO PPV. A replay was shown on HBO prior to the Lomachenko-Walters title fight, which averaged 834,000 viewers. The event produced a live gate of $3.3 million from 10,066 tickets sold, including complimentary tickets, the full attendance was announced as 13,310. The venue was set up to hold 14,227.

Kovalev vs. Ward II

Kovalev's manager Egis Klimas announced that negotiations had begun for the rematch between Ward and Kovalev. According to the NSAC, The T-Mobile Arena was reserved for 17 June 2017 on HBO PPV. On 24 March 2017, Kovalev revealed on social media that he had signed his end of the deal. It was also noted that the rematch would take place at the Mandalay Bay in Paradise, Nevada, on HBO PPV. On 4 April, Roc Nation Sports and Main Events confirmed that terms were agreed for the rematch to take place on HBO PPV. The fight was billed as "No Excuses". The Las Vegas Sun confirmed the bout would take place at the Mandalay Bay Events Center. On 10 April, Duva said that there would be no rematch clause in place for a third fight, which meant the winner would not be obliged to fight another rematch. The fight purses were revealed before the fight with Ward taking a guaranteed $6.5 million and Kovalev, not having a base purse, receiving a percentage of PPV and gate revenue.

The fight ended in the eighth round with Ward's victory. At the end of the match, two judges had Ward ahead at 67–66, whilst the third judge had it 68–65 in favour of Kovalev. CompuBox stats showed that Ward landed 80 of 238 punches (34%) whilst Kovalev landed 95 of his 407 thrown (23%).

Ward commended Kovalev in the post-fight interview, "He's a good fighter, and I have nothing but respect for him. First time around, the man is world champion, and he's been on top a long time. I give him credit. He is a great fighter, and when you fight great fighters, you have to raise your game." Kovalev said the fight could have continued, "I don't know. I can't explain it. Not every round, but I thought I was doing very good. I was better, and he was better this fight. I didn't feel like I was getting knocked down with his punches --- I could have continued," Kovalev said. "I didn't feel the punch. This is fighting. We are boxers. Yes, he did punch me, but he didn't hurt me. The fight should have continued."

According to Yahoo Sports, the fight generated around 130,000 buys on HBO PPV. The replay was shown on regular HBO, which averaged 752,000 viewers and peaked at 947,000 during the final round. The event produced $2,187,340 from 6,366 tickets sold, including complimentary tickets. The number of attendees was announced to be 10,592.

Kovalev spoke to reporters in Russia on 27 June 2017, and confirmed that he would be making changes to his team, which included a new head trainer, meaning he would part ways with John David Jackson, and a new specialist. Due to having issues making the light-heavyweight limit, Kovalev considered moving up to cruiserweight. Reports also suggested that Ward's trainer, Virgil Hunter offered his services to Kovalev. On 26 October, Kovalev announced Abror Tursunpulatov as his new trainer. Tursunpulatov was most known for training and developing amateurs, such as the 2016 Rio Olympic Gold medalist Fazliddin Gaibnazarov.

Second reign as WBO light-heavyweight champion

Kovalev vs. Shabranskyy
On 25 November, Kovalev appeared on Boxing After Dark against light-heavyweight contender Vyacheslav Shabranskyy (19–1, 16 KOs) in a scheduled ten-round bout that took place at The Theater at Madison Square Garden in New York City. Kovalev spoke about his consecutive defeats, “I learned a lot from my fights with Andre Ward. When you don’t win and when you suffer adversity, it makes you stronger. It also shows you who your real friends are. I feel like I cleaned out my life and now I’m ready to start fresh. I’m very veexcited to get back in the ring and fight at Madison Square Garden for the first time, and I’m focused on the future. I’m not looking back.” Kovalev told Ringtv that he would not have a lead trainer for the fight. On 12 October, Main Events asked the WBO to sanction the fight for their vacant title, following Ward's retirement from boxing. At the time, Shabranskyy was not ranked by WBO in their top 15. On 26 October, WBO decided to sanction the fight, also meaning the fight would now be a 12-round bout. On 15 November, the International Boxing Association announced that they would be sanctioning the fight for their vacant light-heavyweight title. The IBA title was last held by Beibut Shumenov, until he lost to Hopkins in April 2014. Due to Hopkins not paying their sanctioning fees, the title remained vacant.

Kovalev regained the WBO title after stopping Shabranskyy in round two. Kovalev knocked Shabranskyy down three times during the fight before it was stopped. Speaking to Max Kellerman of HBO, Kovalev said, "I did it. I worked really hard. Mentally, physically, I'm back. It's my goal to be the best in the division. Last fight I was stopped, it was a decision by the referee. Here tonight was great boxing for me and I love boxing and I am here to make great fights." He also went on to say that he would like unification fights going forward. CompuBox showed that Kovalev landed 50 of 113 punches (44%), this included 25 of 36 power shots in round two and Shabranskyy landed 16 of 71 thrown (23%). According to Nielsen Media Research, the fight averaged 869,000 viewers and peaked at 900,000 viewers.

Kovalev vs. Mikhalkin 
Immediately after defeating Shabranskyy, Kovalev stated that he would return to The Theater on 3 March 2018 in the hopes of joining a unification fight with belt holders Artur Beterbiev (IBF), Dmitry Bivol (WBA), and Stevenson (WBC). On 18 December, ESPN reported a deal was close to being made for Kovalev to defend his WBO title against IBO titleholder Igor Mikhalkin (21–1, 9 KOs), who was on a 10-fight win streak. The fight took place on 3 March 2018, at the Theater at Madison Square Garden on HBO. Initially, Mikhalkin was in talks with contender Marcus Browne for a final eliminator. Kovalev retained his world title and defeated Mikhalkin via TKO in round 7. After the fight, Kovalev said, “This was better work for me than my last fight. It may have looked easy but it was not easy tonight.” According to CompuBox, Kovalev landed 186 of 525 punches (35%) and Mikhalkin landed 43 of his 275 thrown (16%). The fight averaged 599,000 viewers and peaked at 674,000 viewers.

Kovalev vs. Eleider Álvarez 
On 18 March, a deal was made for Kovalev to defend his WBO title against Browne at the Hulu Theater at Madison Square Garden on HBO. A date as early as 23 June was discussed but not finalized. On 6 April, Browne was arrested for domestic violence, and on 18 April, Kovalev announced he would instead fight longtime WBC mandatory Eleider Álvarez (23–0, 11 KOs) in the summer of 2018 instead. Michel, promoterfor both Álvarez and Stevenson, was unable to come up with an agreement for a step aside fee for Álvarez to allow Stevenson to fight Badou Jack in May 2018; Alvarez's manager Stephane Lepine then contacted Main Events for a possible fight. On 4 August, the fight took place at the Hard Rock Hotel & Casino in Atlantic City, New Jersey.  Álvarez won the fight via TKO in round 7 to claim the WBO title. Álvarez explained that part of the game plan was to wait for Kovalev to tire. Referee David Fields stopped the fight.

After the fight, Duva confirmed there was a rematch clause in the contract, but was unsure if the rematch would take place straight away. Kovalev was hospitalized as a precaution. He thanked his fans for their support, and hinted at retirement. Through a translator, Álvarez said, "Words cannot describe how I feel. I want to thank God and all my fans in Canada and Colombia. This was all for them. It was a two-punch combination [for the final knockdown] that I have been throwing my whole career, and we worked on it in camp. I have always practiced that in camp, and we thought it would work in this camp." CompuBox statistics showed that Kovalev landed 91 punches of 339 thrown (27%) and Álvarez landed 73 of his 251 thrown (29%). The fight averaged 731,000 viewers and peaked at 813,000 viewers.

Third reign as WBO light-heavyweight champion

Kovalev vs. Eleider Álvarez II 
On 25 August, Kovalev said he would exercise the rematch clause; according to the contract, the fight needed to occur by February 2019. Early talks indicated the rematch would take place in December 2018. A stumbling block appeared when HBO confirmed they were not fully committed to airing a rematch between the two fighters. Duva stated at any point competing networks could bid on the bout, but all HBO needed to do was match the highest bid to broadcast the fight. On 14 September, it was announced that ESPN would broadcast the rematch. The fight took place on 2 February 2019 at the Ford Center at The Star in Frisco, Texas. Kovalev worked with his new trainer Buddy McGirt for the bout, ending his three-fight run with Tursunpulatov.

Kovalev regained the WBO title after defeating Álvarez by a 12-round unanimous decision and became a three-time light-heavyweight titleholder. The judges scored 120–108, 116–112, and 116–112 for Kovalev.

After the fight, Duva said, "I'm thrilled. It's sweeter when nobody thinks you can do it." On the loss, Álvarez said, "I have no excuses. I know if it went the distance he would be the favorite so I tried to press the fight. I thought I put on a good performance. I don't see myself as a loser, but I do give him credit. He went out and proved he wanted to win the fight." Kovalev gave his training team credit: "This training camp I had help from my team, Buddy and Teddy. Thank you guys for this. They stopped me from overtraining. I saved my energy and I'm happy. We worked on the jab. Always my jab and right hand." According to CompuBox statistics, Kovalev landed 213 of 816 punches (26%), and Álvarez connected with 111 of his 369 shots (30%).

Kovalev vs. Yarde 
On 24 August 2019,  Kovalev faced off against British challenger Anthony Yarde, who previously stopped 17 of his 18 opponents, at Traktor Arena in Kovalev's hometown of Chelyabinsk, Russia. Yarde was ranked #1 by the WBO at light-heavyweight.

After 11 rounds, Kovalev knocked out Yarde with a straight left jab, ending the fight via TKO and retaining his WBO and ESP light-heavyweight titles. According to CompuBox, Kovalev landed 223 of his 686 punches (32.5%) while Yarde landed 132 of his 575 punches (23%), the most punches any fighter has landed on Kovalev. After the fight, Kovalev praised Yarde for his toughness, saying that Yarde "will 100% percent become a world champion one day".

Kovalev vs. Canelo Álvarez 
Less than three months after beating Yarde, Kovalev faced unified middleweight champion Canelo Álvarez on 2 November 2019, who made his debut in the light-heavyweight division. After a competitive first ten rounds in which Kovalev found success with his jab, Álvarez threw a left hook, straight right combination to stop Kovalev in the eleventh round.

After the fight, Kovalev suggested that he had always been unlikely to win the fight, due to the grueling schedule of back-to-back training camps which resulted from the short period of time between the Yarde and Álvarez fights, but had agreed to fight the latter regardless due to the high financial incentive, which was reported to be $12 million (£9 million). Álvarez responded by calling Kovalev a "bad loser".

Canceled fights vs. Barrera and Melikuziev 
On 5 March 2020, it was announced that Kovalev would return to the ring on 25 April to fight light-heavyweight contender Sullivan Barrera. The fight was canceled due to the COVID-19 pandemic. Kovalev was next scheduled to fight Bektemir Melikuziev on 30 January 2021,[123] but the fight was canceled after Kovalev tested positive for a banned substance.[124][125]

Cruiserweight debut 
On May 14, 2022, Kovalev finally made his return 2 years after his KO loss to Canelo Alvarez. He fought undefeated Tervel Pulev at the Kia Forum in Inglewood, California. Kovalev outworked Pulev to a unanimous decision with the scores of 98-92, 98-92 and 97-93 to give Pulev his first professional defeat.

Felony assault charge
On June 9, 2018, Kovalev was arrested in California for punching a woman in the face; the woman suffered a broken nose, a concussion, and a displaced disc in her neck. He was charged with assault likely to cause great bodily injury, which is a felony; he pleaded not guilty on 27 August 2018, and he was released on $50,000 bail. On 4 April 2019, Kovalev was held to answer for felony assault causing great bodily injury; the Court found that there was enough evidence to proceed to trial on the felony charge. Kovalev was arraigned on 19 April 2019, and was also sued by the victim in San Bernardino County Superior Court.

In January 2020, the accuser filed a new lawsuit against Kovalev in federal court in Los Angeles, alleging that the parties reached a $650,000 settlement in October 2019, but that Kovalev then breached the agreement by not making the agreed-upon payments. Because the original suit was not to be dismissed until Kovalev paid the entire $650,000, that suit also remained active.  The victim voluntarily dismissed the breach of contract lawsuit in September 2020, but the original assault lawsuit remained pending and was set for trial beginning in January 2021.

On October 2, 2020, three days before his felony assault trial was scheduled to begin, Kovalev pleaded guilty to a misdemeanor charge of fighting/noise/offensive words and was sentenced to three years of probation and two days of time served. He was also required to complete an anger management course and pay court costs. A few weeks later, Kovalev's accuser filed to dismiss her assault lawsuit.

Professional boxing record

Pay-per-view bouts

References

External links

Sergey Kovalev - Profile, News Archive & Current Rankings at Box.Live

1983 births
Living people
Russian male boxers
World light-heavyweight boxing champions
World boxing champions
World Boxing Association champions
International Boxing Federation champions
World Boxing Organization champions
Sportspeople from Chelyabinsk